Roman Šimíček (born November 4, 1971) is a Czech former professional ice hockey centre who currently played in the National Hockey League with the Pittsburgh Penguins and the Minnesota Wild.

Career

Playing career
Šimíček was drafted in the ninth round, 273rd overall, by the Pittsburgh Penguins in the 2000 NHL Entry Draft. He played 29 National Hockey League games with the Penguins in the 2000–01 season before he was traded to the Minnesota Wild in exchange for Steve McKenna.  He appeared in 34 more NHL games with the Wild during the 2000–01 and 2001–02 season. Šimíček has played in the Czech Republic with HC Vitkovice, before signed with HC Dukla Trenčín on 2 June 2009.

On August 11, 2010, Simicek signed a one-year contract with GKS Tychy of the Polska Liga Hokejowa. After three seasons, Simicek announced his retirement from playing and accepted an assistant coaching position with Vitkovice.

Coaching career
Šimíček signed a coaching contract with Orli Znojmo in December 2016.

Career statistics

Regular season and playoffs

International

References

External links

1971 births
Czech ice hockey centres
HIFK (ice hockey) players
Houston Aeros (1994–2013) players
HPK players
Living people
Minnesota Wild players
Sportspeople from Ostrava
Pittsburgh Penguins draft picks
Pittsburgh Penguins players
HC Sparta Praha players
HC Vítkovice players
Czech expatriate ice hockey players in Finland
Czech expatriate ice hockey players in the United States
Czech expatriate ice hockey players in Slovakia
Czech expatriate sportspeople in Poland
Expatriate ice hockey players in Poland